Petr Gottwald (born 28 April 1973) is a Czech professional footballer who plays as an offensive midfielder.

Club career
Gottwald has played for several Czech and Austrian football clubs, and in 1998 played for the Jeonbuk Dinos in South Korea's K League.

References

Enternal links
 

1973 births
Living people
Czech footballers
Jeonbuk Hyundai Motors players
K League 1 players
Expatriate footballers in Poland
Association football forwards
Sportspeople from Prostějov